Flashback: The Best of 38 Special is a best-of compilation album by the southern rock band 38 Special, released in 1987. It contains several of the band's greatest hits, such as "Hold On Loosely" and "Caught Up in You", as well as two hit songs from soundtracks previously unavailable on a 38 Special album, "Back to Paradise" and "Teacher, Teacher". It also features one brand-new track unique to this compilation, "Same Old Feeling".

Track listing

The live tracks were recorded by the Westwood One Mobile.

Personnel
Don Barnes – guitar, lead vocals, background vocals, harmonica on "Rough Housin'"
Steve Brookins – percussion, drums
Jeff Carlisi – dobro, guitar, steel guitar
Jack Grondin – drums
Larry Junstrom – bass guitar
Donnie Van Zant – background vocals, lead vocals on tracks 3, 7, 10, 13

Notes 

38 Special (band) albums
1987 greatest hits albums
A&M Records compilation albums